South Nallur is a panchayat town in Tiruppur district in the Indian state of Tamil Nadu.

Demographics

 India census, South Nallur had a population of 30,319. Males constitute 53% of the population and females 47%. South Nallur has an average literacy rate of 75%, higher than the national average of 59.5%: male literacy is 80%, and female literacy is 68%. In South Nallur, 11% of the population is under 6 years of age.

As per the religious census of 2011, S.Nallur had 85.52% Hindus, 9.51% Muslims, 4.75% Christians, 0.01% Sikhs, 0.01% Buddhists, 0.02% Jains and 0.18% following other religions.

References

Villages in Coimbatore district